Tubulin alpha-1A chain is a protein that in humans is encoded by the TUBA1A gene.

Background
Tubulin alpha-1A chain is an alpha-tubulin that participates in the formation of microtubules - structural proteins that participate in cytoskeletal structure. Specifically, microtubules are composed of a heterodimer of alpha and beta-tubulin molecules. Cowan et al. demonstrated that bα1 is a primary α-tubulin of the human fetal brain, and that it is expressed solely in that structure, by way of Northern blot. Miller et al. further elaborated on the role of α-tubulins and the process of neuronal development and maturation, comparing the expressions of rat α-tubulins Tα1 and T26. These two rat α-tubulins are homologs of bα1 and kα1 showing that a rat homolog of human TUBA1A (Tα1) had elevated expression during the extension of neuronal processes. Culturing of pheochromocytoma cells with Nerve Growth Factor (NGF) induced differentiation and the development of neuronal processes. Northern blot assay showed markedly elevated levels of Tα1 mRNA expression; T26 mRNA expression increased minimally with exposure to NGF. These data suggest that TUBA1A models the brain by participating in the directing of neuronal migration through the ability of microtubules to readily form and break polymers to extend and retract processes to induce nucleokinesis. Poirier et al. used RNA in situ hybridization to show TUBA1A expression in mice embryo; embryo sections from embryonic day 16.5 “showed a strong labeling in the telencephalon, diencephalon, and mesencephalon, the developing cerebellum, the brainstem, the spinal cord, and the dorsal root ganglia”.

Function 

Microtubules of the eukaryotic cytoskeleton perform essential and diverse functions and are composed of a heterodimer of alpha and beta tubulins. The genes encoding these microtubule constituents belong to the tubulin superfamily, which is composed of six distinct families. Genes from the alpha, beta and gamma tubulin families are found in all eukaryotes. The alpha and beta tubulins represent the major components of microtubules, while gamma tubulin plays a critical role in the nucleation of microtubule assembly. There are multiple alpha and beta tubulin genes, which are highly conserved among species. This gene encodes alpha tubulin and is highly similar to mouse and rat Tuba1 gene. Northern blotting studies have shown that the gene expression is predominantly found in morphologically differentiated neurologic cells. This gene is one of three alpha-tubulin genes in a cluster on chromosome 12q.

Interactions 

TUBA1A has been shown to interact with PAFAH1B1.

Disease

Mutations to the TUBA1A gene manifest clinically as Type 3 Lissencephaly.  In general, lissencephaly is characterized by agyria (lacking of gyri and sulci to the brain – a smooth brain), seizure activity, failure to thrive, as well as intellectual disability and psychomotor retardation, often to a profound degree.
The symptoms of Lis3 Lissencephaly are not especially different from generalized lissencephaly (Lis1, related to PAFAH1B1). Diagnosis of lissencephaly generally is made from the symptom profile, while attribution to a specific type is obtained by microarray.  Treatment is symptomatic; anti-convulsive drugs for seizure activity, g-button gastrostomy to feed the child, physical therapy for muscle disorders. TUBA1A mutation is common in microlissencephaly

Animal model

Keays et al. describe a mouse with a mutation of the TUBA1A gene induced by N-ethyl-N-nitrosourea.  The relevant point mutation resulted in S140G; the site of the mutation participates in the N-site of the formed α-tubulin, and participates in stabilizing the α-β tubulin polymer by binding GTP at this site. The S140G mutation resulted in the formation of a “compromised GTP binding pocket”.  Authors note defects associated with cortical layers II/III and IV, especially in cortical neuronal migration (with respect to wild-type counterparts), showing that the S140G mutation has value as a model for detailing disease associated with the Human TUBA homolog.

References

Further reading

External links